Tales of Terror was the first and only full-length self-titled album released by Californian hardcore punk band Tales of Terror on September 1, 1984 on the label CD Presents.

Background and recording
Seattle pioneer grunge band Green River admired them and recognised Tales of Terror as worthy predecessors by covering one of their songs as a tribute. Local college radio stations would often play their songs, for instance "Over Elvis Worship".

Reception
Al Flipside reviewed Tales of Terror for Flipside in 1984. He wrote: "Mid-tempo driving grunge rock that gets pretty chaotic. I really liked their version of "Hound Dog" from the start, but it took me a while to be convinced. There's people that swear by these guys. I'm beginning to see..."

Tim Yohannan also reviewed Tales of Terror for Maximumrocknroll in 1984.  He wrote: "Totally drunken, power-chord punk rock, folks.  It's straight out of The Dead Boys/Stooges school of intense, fuck-it-all, snarl and self-destruct. These Sacramento's are good at it too. Recommended."

Influence
The album is listed in Kurt Cobain's Journals at number 32 in a list of 50 and the song "Chambers of Horror" is in a list of songs.

Green River covered the Tales' song "Ozzy" renaming it as "Ozzie" on their 1987 EP Dry As a Bone. Alex Vincent, Green River's drummer, attended high school (Encina) with Magner, while he was in Sacramento, California band the Square Cools, for two years before moving to Seattle.

In 2008, Seattle band Mudhoney released The Lucky Ones. The ninth track on this album is titled "Tales of Terror" as another tribute. Mark Arm, the lead singer of Mudhoney, was also the lead singer for Green River.

The Melvins covered the song "Romance" for their 2013 covers album Everybody Loves Sausages. Guitarist/frontman Buzz Osbourne has talked about the track and the band in various interviews and stated that it's one of if not the best record to come out of California.

Crystal Fairy, a band featuring members of The Melvins, At The Drive In and Le Butcherettes, covered the song "Possession", renamed "Posesión", on their self-titled 2017 album.

Track listing
All lyrics written by Pat Stratford, all music composed by Lyon Wong, Trip Bender, Geoff Magner, and Mike Hunter, except where noted.
Side one

Cassette bonus track #1

Side two

Cassette bonus track #2

For the cassette version one LP track ("Jim") is missing. (songbook was available separately.)

Personnel
Adapted from Discogs.

Tales of Terror
Geoff Magner – bass guitar, backing vocals (credited as "Dusty Coffin")
Mike Hunter – drums,  [And Jokes] (credited as "Thopper Jaw")
Steve Hunt – guitars, backing vocals (credited as "Capt. Trip Mender")
 Lyon Wong – guitars, backing vocals (credited as "Luther Storms")
Pat Stratford – lead vocals [And Other Organs] (credited as "Rat's Ass")

Production
Paul Rat – production
Gary Mankin, Scott Chandler – engineering
Gary Hobish – mastering engineer
Erich Mueller – photography [cover]
Victor Wong – photography [back cover]

References

External links
Maximumrocknroll Archive, Flipside Archive

1984 albums
Tales of Terror (band) albums
Music of the San Francisco Bay Area